Sean Beaudoin is an American writer.

Biography
Beaudoin is the author of the Young Adult novels Going Nowhere Faster, Fade To Blue, You Killed Wesley Payne, The Infects, and Wise Young Fool. He has a collection of adult short stories forthcoming from Algonquin Press. His short stories and articles have appeared in numerous publications including The Onion, Glimmer Train, The San Francisco Chronicle, Opium, Narrative Magazine, Bat City Review, Identity Theory, Instant City, Another Chicago Magazine, The New Orleans Review, Barrelhouse, Bayou, and Redivider. He is a founding editor of the arts and culture website TheWeeklings.com

Published works

Novels
You Killed Wesley Payne, 2011, Little Brown
Fade To Blue, 2009, Little Brown
Going Nowhere Faster, 2008, Little Brown
The Infects, 2011, Candlewick Press. 
Wise Young Fool, 2012, Little, Brown

Short stories
Identity Theory, "Spectacle"
Narrative Magazine, "Night Dreams" 
"Winter Ninety-Five Spring Ninety-Six", Fall 2008
New Orleans Review - "Fight"s
Opium "The Bridesmaid"
Danger City Anthology

Articles
The Onion
San Francisco Chronicle
Glimmer Train

References

External links

 
Redroom

Living people
Writers from Seattle
Year of birth missing (living people)